The People's Labour Movement (abbreviated PLM; initially as Democratic Labour Party (DLP)) was a political party in Grenada founded by Francis Alexis. It was one of the oldest political parties of Grenada. It became defunct after the 2008 elections.

History
The PLM was one of the oldest political parties of Grenada, along with the Grenada United Labour Party. The organization was created by the former Attorney General Francis Alexis. In the late 1990s, Alexis left the party to work on his political issues. In 2002, the party merged with the Maurice Bishop Patriotic Movement. At the 2003 elections, the party won 2.2% of the popular vote and no seats. For the July 2008 election, it formed a coalition with its longtime rival, the Grenada United Labour Party; the combined United Labour Platform fielded 11 candidates for the 15 seats, netting 0.84% of the vote and no victories. The party became defunct after the 2008 elections.

References

Communist parties in Grenada
Labour parties
Political parties in Grenada